Didymateiche, or Didymon Teichos ('twin walled'), was a town of ancient Mysia. It belonged to the Delian League since it appears in tribute records of Athens between the years 454/3 and 418/7 BCE. Polybius writes that it was among the places that were conquered by Attalus I, after the city of Carseae.

Its site is located north of Biga / Çanakkale, Turkey, Asiatic Turkey.

References

Populated places in ancient Mysia
Former populated places in Turkey
Greek city-states
Members of the Delian League
History of Çanakkale Province